Sherwood is a hamlet in Cayuga County, New York, United States.

It is the location of four properties or districts listed on the National Register of Historic Places:
Augustus Howland House, 1395 Sherwood Rd., Sherwood
Slocum and Hannah Howland House, 1781 Sherwood Rd., Sherwood 	
Job and Deborah Otis House, 1882-1886 Sherwood Rd., Sherwood
Sherwood Equal Rights Historic District, Sherwood Rd. & NY 34B, Sherwood

Notable people

Painter Amy Otis was a native of Sherwood.

Quaker abolitionist Emily Howland was from Sherwood.

References

Hamlets in New York (state)
Hamlets in Cayuga County, New York